The R595 road is a regional road in Ireland. It is a road on the Haven Coast in west County Cork. The road forms part of the Wild Atlantic Way.

The R595 travels southwest from the N71 at Skibbereen along the estuary of the River Ilen. It ends at the port village of Baltimore, where ferries depart for Sherkin Island and Cape Clear Island.

References

Regional roads in the Republic of Ireland
Roads in County Cork